Berrieux is a commune in the department of Aisne in Hauts-de-France in northern France.

History 

During the First World War, Berrieux was located on the front line between the French and German forces. The village was completely destroyed and rebuilt after the war.

Population

See also
Communes of the Aisne department

References

Communes of Aisne
Aisne communes articles needing translation from French Wikipedia